The Oldenburg International Film Festival has covered the international movie scene in all aspects since 1994. It is situated in Oldenburg, Germany. Its open-minded approach leads to a mixture of movie premieres and original independent productions. Innovation and contrarian ideas are some features of the festival.

Among the guests of honor were Alex Cox, Frank Oz, James B. Harris, Tim Hunter, Belgian cult director Harry Kümel, Jim McBride, Philippe de Broca, Andrzej Żuławski, Ken Russell, Jerry Schatzberg and Ovidio G. Assonitis who have all attended the festival for the retrospectives of their work. Icíar Bollaín, Seymour Cassel, Asia Argento, Stacy Cochran, Richard Stanley, Ben Gazzara, Larry Clark, Tim Blake Nelson as well as Luke and Andrew Wilson have attended the festival for tributes in their honor.

Internationally acclaimed films, such as Park Chan-wook’s The Handmaiden, Takeshi Kitano’s Kids Return, David Cronenberg’s Spider, Kevin Spacey’s Albino Alligator, Steven Soderbergh’s Out of Sight, Larry Clark’s Ken Park, Luke and Andrew Wilson’s The Wendell Baker Story, and The Fountain by Darren Aronofsky or indie hits like Larry Fessenden’s Habit, Cory McAbee’s The American Astronaut, Michael Polish’s Northfork, Paul Provenza’s The Aristocrats, Susan Buice and Arin Crumley’s Four Eyed Monsters or The Guatemalan Handshake by Todd Rohal, received their German premiere in Oldenburg.

Tributes and Retrospectives

Tributes (by year)
1994: Nancy Savoca
1995: Katt Shea
1996: (none)
1997: Icíar Bollaín
1989: Seymour Cassel
1999: Asia Argento
2000: Stacy Cochran
2001: Ben Gazzara, Richard Stanley
2002: Édouard Niermans
2003: Larry Clark
2004: Tim Blake Nelson
2005: Luke Wilson and Andrew Wilson
2006: Peter Fleischmann
2007: Stacy Keach
2008: Marius Müller-Westernhagen, Michael Wadleigh
2009: Scott McGehee, David Siegel
2010: Timothy Bottoms
2011: Roger Fritz
2012: (none)
2013: Bobcat Goldthwait
2014: (none)
2015: Joanna Cassidy
2016: Nicolas Cage, Amanda Plummer
2017: Lou Diamond Phillips
2018: Keith Carradine
2019: Seymour Cassel
 2020: (none)
 2021: Mattie Do

Retrospectives
1994: Alex Cox
1995: Frank Oz
1996: James B. Harris
1997: Tim Hunter
1998: Roberto Faenza
1999: Harry Kümel
2000: William Wellman Jr.
2001: Jim McBride
2002: Bernard Rose
2003: Philippe de Broca
2004: Andrzej Żuławski
2005: Ken Russell
2006: Jerry Schatzberg
2007: Abel Ferrara
2008: James Toback
2009: Bruno Barreto
2010: Radley Metzger
2011: Ted Kotcheff
2012: Phedon Papamichael
2013: Mania Akbari
2014: Philippe Mora
2015: George Armitage
2016: Christophe Honoré
2017: Edward R. Pressman
2018: Bruce Robinson
2019: Burkhard Driest
 2020: William Friedkin
 2021: Ovidio G. Assonitis

Awards

German Independence Award: Audience Award

 1998: Richard Schenkman — Went to Coney Island on a Mission from God... Be Back by Five — USA, 1998
 1999: Noah Stern — The Invisibles — USA, 1999
 2001: Buket Alakuş — Anam — Germany, 2001
 2002: Scott Thomas — Anacardium (Deranged) — USA, 2001
 2003: Michael Polish — Northfork — USA, 2003
 2004: Dennis Iliadis — Hardcore — Greece, 2003
 2005: Marcos Siega — Pretty Persuasion — USA, 2005
 2006: Scott Dacko — The Insurgents — USA, 2006
 2007: Jan Hinrik Drevs — Underdogs — Germany, 2006/2007
 2008: Emily Atef — The Stranger in Me (Das Fremde in mir) — Germany, 2008
 2009: Judi Krant — Made in China — USA, 2009
 2010: Paul Gordon — The Happy Poet — USA 2010
 2011: K. Lorrel Manning — Happy New Year — USA, 2011
 2012: Jan-Ole Gerster — Oh Boy — Germany, 2012
 2013: David Perrault — Our Heroes Died Tonight (Nos heros sont morts ce soir)  — France, 2013
 2014: Michal Samir — Hany — Czech Republic, 2014
 2015: Tom Sommerlatte —  (Im Sommer wohnt er unten) — Germany/France, 2015
 2016: Emre Konuk — The Apprentice (Çirak) — Turkey, 2016
 2017: Kubilay Sarikaya and Sedat Kirtan — Familiye — Germany, 2017
 2018: Mikhal Raskhodnikov — Vremennye trudnosti — Russia, 2018
 2019: Adam VillaSenor and Reza Ghassemi — In Full Bloom — USA/JAPAN, 2020
 2020: Miles Hargrove - Miracle Fishing - USA

German Independence Award: Best German Film 
The Best German Film award is juried by an international panel of five—filmmakers, actors, artists, writers, producers—of which at least three members come from other countries than Germany. The films are shown in original version with English subtitles. Jury members have been, e.g., in 2011: Matteo Lovadina, Radley Metzger, Ildi Toth Davy, Soopum Sohn, and Matthew Modine. The 2012 festival saw an all-woman jury, consisting of Tamar Simon Hoffs, Gabrielle Miller, Lana Morgan, Debbie Rochon, and Mira Sorvino.
 
 2004: Andreas Struck — Sugar Orange — Germany, 2004
 2005: Catharina Deus — About a Girl (Die Boxerin) — Germany, 2005  
 2006: Birgit Grosskopf — Princess (Prinzessin)  — Germany, 2006
 2007: Jakob Moritz Erwa — All the Invisible Things (Heile Welt)  — Austria, 2006
 2008: Emily Atef —  The Stranger in Me (Das Fremde in mir) — Germany, 2008
 2009: Thomas Sieben — Distance — Germany, 2009
 2010: Philip Koch — Picco — Germany, 2010
 2011: Linus de Paoli — Dr. Ketel — Germany, 2010
 2012: Jan-Ole Gerster — Oh Boy — Germany, 2012
 2013: Tom Lass — Kaptn Oskar — Germany, 2013
 not awarded since 2014 because of budget cuts

German Independence Award: Best Short Film

 2007: Marcos Valin, David Alonso — Atención al cliente (Customer Service) — Spain, 2007
 2008: Liz Adams — Side Effect — USA, 2008
 2009: Hassan Said — Mute — USA, 2009 (Best foreign-language short film)
 2009: Tom Bewilogua — SCISSU — Germany, 2009 (Best German-language short film)
 2010: Jeremy Bradley, Reuben Sack — Salvation Insurance — USA, 2010
 2011: Markus Engel — Der letzte Gast (The Last Guest) — Austria, 2011
 2012: Meghna Gupta, Gigi Berardi — Unravel — United Kingdom / India, 2012
 2013: Patrick Baumeister — Preis — Germany, 2013
 2014: Kevin Meul — Cadet — Belgium, 2014
 2015: Martijn de Jong — Free — Netherlands, 2014
 2016: Ruken Tekes — The Circle (Hevêrk) — Turkey, 2016
 2017: Thierry Bessling, Loïc Tanson — Sur le fil — Luxembourg, 2017
 2018: Jeremy Comte — Fauve — Canada, 2018
 2019: Kahina Le Querrec - Blue Hour - France, 2019
 2020: Igor Nevedrov - The Coat - Russia, 2020

German Independence Honorary Award

 2013: Mania Akbari, Bobcat Goldthwait
 2014: Philippe Mora
 2015: George Armitage, Joanna Cassidy
 2016: Nicolas Cage, Christophe Honoré, Amanda Plummer
 2017: Edward R. Pressman, Lou Diamond Phillips
 2018: Bruce Robinson, Keith Carradine
 2019: Burkhard Driest
 2020: William Friedkin
 2021: Ovidio G. Assonitis, Mattie Do

Otto Sprenger Award

 2007: Ben Reding, Dominik Reding — For The Unknown Dog (Für den unbekannten Hund) — Germany, 2005
 2008: Emily Atef — The Stranger in Me (Das Fremde in mir) — Germany, 2008

Seymour Cassel Award: Outstanding Performance 
This actor’s prize is awarded for performances in films nominated for the Best German Film award.

 2012: Tom Schilling for his role as Niko Fischer in Oh Boy — Germany, 2012
 2013: Martina Schöne-Radunski for her role as Alex in Kaptn Oskar — Germany, 2013
 2014: Victoria Schulz for her role as Ruby in Von jetzt an kein zurück — Germany, 2014
 2015: Sarah Silverman for her role as Laney in I Smile Back — USA, 2015
 2015: Nikola Rakočević for his role as Slav in Travelator — Serbia, 2014
 2016: Noémie Merlant for her role as Claire in Twisting Fate (À tous les vents du ciel) — France, 2016
 2016: André M. Hennicke for his role as Udo in Strawberry Bubblegums — Germany, 2016
 2017: Gregory Kasyan for his role as Mills in Quest — USA, 2017
 2018: Victoria Carmen Sonne for her role as Sascha in Holiday — Denmark, 2018 and Gabriela Ramos for her role as Lili in Is that you? — UK, 2018
 2019: Patrycja Planik for her performance in Lillian (Austria) and to Zachary Ray Sherman in Cuck by Rob Lambert (USA).

References

External links
 Official web site
 2012 festival catalog (German + English text)

Film festivals in Germany